Gábor Szabó (1936–1982) was a Hungarian jazz guitarist.

Gábor Szabó may also refer to:

 Gabor Szabo (cinematographer) (born 1950), Hungarian cinematographer
 Gábor Szabó (judoka) (born 1967), Australian judoka
 Gábor Lisznyai Szabó (1913–1981), Hungarian composer
 Gábor Mádi Szabó (1922–2003), Hungarian actor
 Gábor P. Szabó (1902–1950), Hungarian footballer
 Gábor Szabó (canoeist), Hungarian sprint canoer